For This Cause is the ninth album in the live praise and worship series of contemporary worship music by Hillsong Church. It was recorded live at the State Sports Centre in Sydney Olympic Park by Darlene Zschech and the Hillsong team, with a congregation of 5,000 people. The album reached No. 17 on the Billboard Top Contemporary Christian Albums Chart and No. 22 on the Top Independent Albums.

Album design
The cover artwork of For This Cause, uses Charme STD as the font to display the title. This cover was designed by Chris Perry Graphic Design and Emma Schuberg (the second to last album to be design by them).

Track listing
 "One Day" (Reuben Morgan) Worship leaders: Darlene Zschech & Reuben Morgan
 "Faith" (Reuben Morgan) Worship leader: Darlene Zschech
 "Awesome in This Place" (Ned Davies) Worship leader: Darlene Zschech b. Steve McPherson
 "Dwell in Your House" (Paul Ewing) Worship leaders: Darlene Zschech & Mark Stevens
 "You Are Near" (Reuben Morgan) Worship leader: Darlene Zschech b. Steve McPherson
 "I Simply Live for You" (Russell Fragar) Worship leader: Miriam Webster b. Steve McPherson
 "Carry Me" (Marty Sampson) Worship leader: Marty Sampson
 "Lifted Me High Again" (Reuben Morgan) Worship leader: Darlene Zschech
 "Here to Eternity" (Darlene Zschech, David Moyse) Worship leader: Darlene Zschech
 "For This Cause" (Joel Houston) Worship leaders: Darlene Zschech & Reuben Morgan
 "Reaching for You" (Raymond Badham) Worship leaders: Rob Eastwood & Darlene Zschech
 "It Is You" (Darlene Zschech) Worship leader: Darlene Zschech
 "Believe" (Donna Lasit) Worship leader: Darlene Zschech & Katrina Peoples
 "Everyday" (Joel Houston) Worship leader: Mark Stevens b. Darlene Zschech

b= lead backing vocal

Band
 Darlene Zschech – worship pastor, producer, worship leader
 Russell Fragar – worship pastor, producer, music director, piano, string arranger
 Reuben Morgan – worship leader, acoustic guitar, electric guitar
 Gilbert Clarke - vocals
 Erica Crocker - vocals
 Jayne Denham - vocals
 Robert Eastwood - vocals
 Lucy Fisher - vocals
 Scott Haslem - vocals
 Donia Makedonez - vocals
 Steve McPherson - vocals
 Reuben Morgan - vocals
 Katrina Peoples - vocals
 Tanya Riches - vocals
 Marty Sampson - vocals
 Mark Stevens - vocals
 Miriam Webster - vocals
 Lisa Young - vocals
 Craig Gower - keyboards, string arranger
 Peter King - keyboards
 David Moyse - acoustic guitar, electric guitar
 Raymond Badham - electric guitar
 Paul Ewing - bass guitar
 Ian Fisher - bass guitar
 Rick Peteriet - drums
 Ross Peacock - drums
 Luke Munns - drums, percussion
 Peter Kelly - percussion
 Greg Hughes - trombone
 Matthew Hope - trumpet
 Steve Bullivant - saxophone
 Troy Carthew - saxophone, flute
 Paul Iannuzzelli - saxophone
 James Rudder - saxophone, violin
 Claire Evans - flute
 Troy Carthew - brass director
 Phillip Sohn - cello
 See Luan Loo - cello
 Rachel Baker - violin
 Lindy Connet - violin
 Ee May Hayes - violin
 Rebekah Skelton - violin
 Jai Schelbach - violin
 Denise Yu - viola
 Margaret Howard - Hillsong kids choir conductor
 Ruth Anthanasio - Hillsong Church choir conductors
 Katia Bowley - Hillsong Church choir conductors

References 

2000 live albums
Hillsong Music live albums